This is a list of the airports served by SAS Braathens, the Norwegian branch of Scandinavian Airlines System (SAS), as of May 31, 2007, the day before the company became an integrated part of Scandinavian Airlines. Flights between Norway and Denmark were served by the Danish branch of SAS. For the list of the other SAS destinations, see Scandinavian Airlines System destinations..

Europe
Belgium
Brussels - Brussels Airport
France
Nice - Côte d'Azur Airport
Paris - Charles de Gaulle Airport
Germany
Berlin - Berlin Tegel Airport
Düsseldorf - Düsseldorf Airport
Frankfurt - Frankfurt Airport
Iceland
Reykjavík - Keflavík International Airport
Ireland
Dublin - Dublin Airport
Italy
Milan - Malpensa Airport
Naples - Naples Airport
Rome - Leonardo da Vinci Airport
Netherlands
Amsterdam - Amsterdam Schiphol Airport
Norway
Ålesund - Ålesund Airport, Vigra
Alta - Alta Airport
Bardufoss - Bardufoss Airport
Bergen - Bergen Airport, Flesland
Bodø - Bodø Airport
Harstad - Harstad/Narvik Airport, Evenes
Haugesund - Haugesund Airport, Karmøy
Kirkenes - Kirkenes Airport, Høybuktmoen
Kristiansand - Kristiansand Airport, Kjevik
Kristiansund - Kristiansund Airport, Kvernberget
Lakselv - Lakselv Airport, Banak seasonal
Molde - Molde Airport, Årø
Oslo - Oslo Airport, Gardermoen
Sandefjord - Sandefjord Airport, Torp
Stavanger - Stavanger Airport, Sola
Tromsø - Tromsø Airport
Trondheim - Trondheim Airport, Værnes
Longyearbyen - Svalbard Airport, Longyear
Portugal
Lisbon - Portela Airport
Spain
Alicante - Alicante Airport
Barcelona - Barcelona Airport
Las Palmas de Gran Canaria - Gran Canaria Airport
Madrid - Barajas Airport
Málaga - Málaga Airport
Switzerland
Zürich - Zurich Airport
Sweden
Stockholm - Stockholm-Arlanda Airport
United Kingdom
Aberdeen - Aberdeen Airport
London
London Heathrow Airport
London Gatwick Airport
Manchester - Manchester Airport

See also
Scandinavian Airlines destinations for the list of destinations served by Scandinavian airlines.
Wideroe destinations for the Norwegian and Swedish destinations.
SAS Group destinations for all the SAS Group destinations.

Lists of airline destinations
Scandinavian Airlines